Jack Camp "Cactus Jack" Curtice Jr. (May 24, 1907 – August 19, 1982) was an American football coach and college athletics administrator. Curtice served as the head football coach West Texas State (1940–1941), Texas Western (1946–1949), Utah (1950–1957), Stanford (1958–1962), and UC Santa Barbara (1962–1969). His teams were known for their passing offenses. His overall record was 135–115–8.

Early years
Curtice was born in Glasgow, Kentucky, in 1907. He attended Louisville Male High School, where he played football, basketball, and baseball and ran hurdles for the track team. He next attended Transylvania University, where he again played football, basketball, and baseball.  He was the quarterback on the Transylvania football team for four years. He won all-Kentucky honors in both football and basketball.

In 1930, Curtice began his coaching career as the basketball and football coach at Elizabethtown High School in Elizabethtown, Kentucky. In two years as the football coach at Elizabethtown, his teams won 14 of 18 games and outscored opponents, 542 to 88. His basketball teams won 47 of 53 games.

In May 1932, Curtice was hired as the athletics coach and history teacher at Owensboro High School in Owensboro, Kentucky. He was a coach there from until he was granted a release from his contract in May 1938.

College coaching career

West Texas State
In 1938, Curtice was hired at West Texas State in Canyon, Texas, as a professor of physical education and freshman coach in all sports. He became an assistant coach for the varsity football team in 1939 and was appointed head coach in December 1939. As head coach at West Texas State, Curtice's 1940 team compiled a 7–3 record and won the Alamo Conference championship. His 1941 squad finished in third place in its first season in the Border Conference and compiled an 8–2 record.

Texas Western and Navy
In January 1942, Curtice was hired as the athletic director and head football coach at the Texas School of Mines (later renamed University of Texas at El Paso). However, he entered the United States Navy before the season began and was unable to begin his coaching duties until after World War II ended.

During the war, Curtice served at Naval Station Norfolk where he coached a basketball team.  He was also assigned to duty in the Aleutian Islands and with the Saint Mary's Pre-Flight School.

Curtice returned to Texas Mines in October 1945, but the school did not field a football team that year. He served as the school's head coach for four years from 1946 to 1949, compiling an overall record of 24–13–3. His 1948 and 1949 squads compiled identical 8–2–1 records and appeared in back-to-back Sun Bowls.

Utah
In June 1950, Curtice was hired to replace Ike Armstrong as the head football coach at Utah. In eight years as the head coach at Utah, Curtice's teams won four Skyline Conference championships and compiled a 45–32–4 record (32–9–2 against Skyline opponents).

Stanford

In January 1958, Curtice was hired as the head football coach at Stanford. Curtice coached at Stanford for five seasons. His teams did not have a winning record in any of those years. His overall record at Stanford was 14–36 (5–19 against conference opponents). He was fired in November 1962.

UC Santa Barbara
In February 1963, Curtice was hired as the head football coach at UC Santa Barbara. His 1965 UC Santa Barbara Gauchos football team compiled an 8–1 record in the regular season, and Curtice received the NCAA College Division Coach of the Year award. In seven seasons at Santa Barbara, his teams compiled a 37–29–1 record.

Curtice retired from coaching in January 1970. In a coaching career that spanned 40 years, he developed a reputation as an innovator and advocate of the passing game. His 1957 Utah Utes football team led the country in passing, and during the decade from 1950 to 1960, he coached seven quarterbacks, including Lee Grosscup and Dick Norman, who ranked in the top 10 in passing. He also wrote a book titled "The Passing Game".

Later years
Curtice remained as athletic director at UC Santa Barbara until his retirement in January 1973.

He died at his home in Santa Barbara, California, on August 19, 1982.

Head coaching record

College

References

External links
 

1907 births
1982 deaths
Stanford Cardinal football coaches
Transylvania Pioneers baseball players
Transylvania Pioneers football players
Transylvania Pioneers men's basketball players
UC Santa Barbara Gauchos athletic directors
UC Santa Barbara Gauchos football coaches
Utah Utes athletic directors
Utah Utes football coaches
UTEP Miners athletic directors
UTEP Miners football coaches
West Texas A&M Buffaloes football coaches
High school football coaches in Kentucky
Transylvania University alumni
People from Glasgow, Kentucky
Sportspeople from Louisville, Kentucky
Coaches of American football from Kentucky
Players of American football from Louisville, Kentucky
Baseball coaches from Kentucky
Baseball players from Louisville, Kentucky
Basketball coaches from Kentucky
Basketball players from Louisville, Kentucky